Sampaloc Church or the Archdiocesan Shrine of Our Lady of Loreto is a Roman Catholic Church located along Figueras Street (formerly Bustillos) in the district of Sampaloc in the City of Manila. The church is named after and dedicated to the Virgin Mary and her pilgrimage site in Loreto, Italy where tradition states as the site where the Mary's house was relocated.

History 
The Franciscans under Father Blas de la Madre de Dios, the Provincial Father of the Philippine Franciscan mission, built the first church on the Sampaloc site in 1613. It was made into a parish that same year, along with the enshrinement of the Marian image of Our Lady of Loreto. A convent was built near the church which in 1621 which served as the first home of the congregation of Poor Clares in the country led by Mother Jeronima de la Asuncion before they moved to Intramuros later that year.

The first church was reconstructed twice, first in 1640 as a result of a 1639 Chinese revolt that burned down the church, and again in 1666 after damage from a 1645 earthquake and because of the needs of a growing community in Sampaloc. The church was also affected by the 1880 earthquake, after which its toppled steeple was reconstructed.

The original jurisdiction of the parish of Sampaloc comprised not only the present Sampaloc district but it also extended into present-day Pandacan and Santa Mesa. Pandacan was separated to have its own parish on 1712 while a separate parish for Santa Mesa was established in 1911. In 1932, another split was made in the parish's territory when a parish was established to serve the community in the eastern part of Sampaloc that is known as Balic-Balic. The administration of the Sampaloc parish by then was given to the Archdiocese of Manila, which was effected in 1899.

The Battle of Manila in 1945 completely destroyed the original church. The church was temporarily rebuilt as a wood and bamboo structure while plans were made for the construction of a more permanent structure. On November 22, 1958, the present church was completed and was rededicated to the Our Lady of Loreto. The church was further adorned with the addition of a bronze sculpture in 1975 by Filipino sculptor Ed Castrillo.

The church was elevated to the status of archdiocesan shrine by the Archdiocese of Manila on December 5, 2002.

Priests of the Sampaloc Church

St. Anthony of Padua Shrine 

Adjacent to the Our Lady of Loreto Archdiocesan Shrine is the St. Anthony of Padua Shrine, a church administered by the Venerable Third Order of the Franciscans. The church traces its origins in 1794, when the Third Order proceeded to build its own church near the premises of the Loreto Church upon the invitation of their Franciscan brethren who were administering Loreto at that time. The church was originally dedicated to the Our Lady of the Pilgrims, but it was destroyed along with the original Loreto Church in the Battle of Manila of 1945.

Work proceeded shortly for the construction of the new church, which was completed in 1947. This time the church was dedicated as a shrine to St. Anthony of Padua after Franciscans decided to transfer the devotional activities to St. Anthony from the now destroyed San Francisco Church in Intramuros to Sampaloc Church.

Due to their proximity and shared history, the Loreto and St. Anthony churches have been known alternately as "the twin churches of Sampaloc" and "the twin churches of Bustillos".

References 

Roman Catholic churches in Manila
Buildings and structures in Sampaloc, Manila
1613 establishments in the Spanish Empire
Cultural Properties of the Philippines in Metro Manila
Churches in the Roman Catholic Archdiocese of Manila